The 1998 Professional SportsCar Racing Championship season was the 28th season of the IMSA GT Championship, the final one of the original IMSA.  It consisted of an open-cockpit World Sports Car (WSC) class of prototypes and Grand Tourer-style racing cars divided into GT1, GT2, and GT3 classes.  It began March 22, 1998, and ended October 25, 1998, after eight rounds.

The IMSA GT Championship was replaced by the American Le Mans Series in 1999, which was supported by the Automobile Club de l'Ouest (ACO).  This series, based on the 24 Hours of Le Mans, was initially previewed during the 1998 season with the running of the inaugural Petit Le Mans.  Professional SportsCar Racing remained as the series organizer.

Of note is the lack of the 24 Hours of Daytona and the Six Hours of Watkins Glen, both of which were acquired by the revived SCCA United States Road Racing Championship.

Schedule

† - Two separate races were held for Lime Rock: One for WSC, one for the GT classes.

Season results

Teams Championship
Points are awarded to the finishers in the following order:
 25-21-19-17-15-14-13-12-11-10-...
Exception however for the 12 Hours of Sebring, which awarded in the following order:
 30-26-24-22-20-19-18-17-16-15-...

Teams only score the points of their highest finishing entry in each race.

WSC Standings

GT1 Standings

GT2 Standings

GT3 Standings

External links
 World Sports Racing Prototypes - 1998 IMSA GT Championship season results

IMSA GT Championship seasons
Imsa GT